Kim Ah-joong (born October 16, 1982) is a South Korean actress, model and singer. She is best known for playing the main character in the romantic comedy 200 Pounds Beauty.

Education
Kim graduated from Korea University with a master's degree in journalism.

Career
Kim made her film debut in the romance film When Romance Meets Destiny (2005). She appeared in several commercials and landed her first leading role in the daily soap opera Bizarre Bunch.

Her breakthrough came in the comedy film 200 Pounds Beauty, where she played an overweight girl who undergoes a cosmetic surgery makeover to become a pop sensation. She was awarded the Best Actress award at the 2007 Grand Bell Awards. She released soundtracks of the film, "Beautiful Girl" and the Korean version of the song "Maria". "Beautiful Girl" won Digital Music Awards' "Song of the Month"  by Cyworld.

Kim returned to acting three years later, starring alongside Hwang Jung-min in the romantic comedy The Accidental Couple. 
In 2010, Kim was cast in a U.S.-Chinese film project Amazing, a sci-fi film about the development of a virtual-reality basketball game. The same year, she was cast in the medical drama Sign by Kim Eun-hee, playing a forensic scientist.

In September 2011, Kim was found guilty of tax evasion. She also had to pay an additional $600,000 fine. She and her management at the time parted ways due to the verdict. Due to this scandal she was banned from TV work in South Korea from late 2011 to late 2014, and she focused on films. In December 2012, Kim co-starred with Ji Sung in the romantic comedy film My PS Partner. 
This was followed by another romantic comedy film Steal My Heart in 2013.

She returned to TV in the legal drama Punch, where she received positive reviews for her portrayal of a prosecutor. 
In 2016, Kim starred in the crime thriller Wanted. 
In 2017, she starred in the time-slip romantic comedy Live Up to Your Name alongside Kim Nam-gil.

In 2018, Kim was cast in the film adaptation of OCN's crime drama Bad Guys.

Ambassador roles
2009: Goodwill Ambassador of FranceExpress
2009: 46th Savings Day: Prime Minister Commendation
2015: Ambassador for 17th Seoul International Women's Film Festival

Filmography

Film

Television series

Music video
 Shin Hye-sung – Same thought
 Youme – 여자라서 하지 못한 말

Awards and nominations

References

External links 
 Kim Ah Joong Instagram
 

1982 births
Living people
Dongduk Women's University alumni
Korea University alumni
Actresses from Seoul
South Korean expatriates in Switzerland
South Korean female idols
South Korean female models
South Korean film actresses
South Korean television actresses
21st-century South Korean singers
21st-century South Korean women singers
Gwangsan Kim clan
South Korean people convicted of tax crimes